Renan Brito Soares or simply Renan  (born 24 January 1985 in Viamão) is a Brazilian footballer who plays as a goalkeeper for Bento Gonçalves.

Career 
Renan made his professional debut for Internacional against Juventude in the Rio Grande do Sul State League in a 1–0 win on April 3, 2005.

Valencia
Renan joined Spanish club Valencia on 13 August 2008. He made his debut for Valencia CF in a 3–0 win against Real Mallorca. He made a great start to his Valencia CF career and was their number one keeper, but on 20 January 2009 he sustained a groin injury in a match against Athletic de Bilbao and was ruled out for six weeks, enabling veteran César Sánchez to step in. After recovering from his injury he remained on the bench till the end of the 2008–09 season owing to Cesar's fine form, and following the close season signing of Miguel Ángel Moyà from Real Mallorca he left the Mestalla.

Xerez
Xerez signed the Brazilian goalkeeper on loan from Valencia on 27 July 2009.

Internacional
On 4 June 2010, Sport Club Internacional signed him on loan from Valencia.

On 13 December 2018, Renan joined Campeonato Brasileiro Série B side São Bento on a one-year contract.

International career
Renan was a member of Brazil's team for the 2008 Summer Olympics, he was the first-choice goalkeeper for the tournament, appearing in all matches as Brazil went on to get the bronze medal.

Honours

Club
Internacional
 Rio Grande do Sul State League: 2005, 2008, 2011, 2012
 Copa Libertadores: 2006, 2010
 FIFA Club World Cup: 2006
 Recopa Sudamericana: 2007, 2011

Goiás
 Goiás State League: 2013

International
Brazil
 2008 Summer Olympics: Bronze medal winner

References

External links 
 
 
  
 

1985 births
Living people
Brazilian footballers
Brazil youth international footballers
Brazil under-20 international footballers
Brazilian expatriate footballers
Sport Club Internacional players
Valencia CF players
Xerez CD footballers
Goiás Esporte Clube players
Ceará Sporting Club players
Esporte Clube São Bento players
Clube Esportivo Bento Gonçalves players
Campeonato Brasileiro Série A players
Campeonato Brasileiro Série B players
La Liga players
Association football goalkeepers
Footballers at the 2008 Summer Olympics
Olympic footballers of Brazil
Olympic bronze medalists for Brazil
Olympic medalists in football
Medalists at the 2008 Summer Olympics
Expatriate footballers in Spain
Brazilian expatriate sportspeople in Spain